A list of rivers of Saxony, Germany:

A
Alte Luppe

B
Bahra
Bahre
Batschke
Bauerngraben
Biela
Black Elster
Black Pockau
Bobritzsch
Borlasbach
Brunndöbra
Burgauenbach

C
Chemnitz
Colmnitzbach
Cunnersdorfer Wasser

D
Dahle
Döllnitz

E
Eastern Rietzschke
Elbe
Eula

F
Fällbach
Feilebach
Fleißenbach
Flöha
Freiberger Mulde
Friesenbach

G
Geberbach
Gimmlitz
Goldbach
Göltzsch
Gösel
Gottleuba
Greifenbach
Große Bockau
Große Lößnitz
Große Mittweida
Große Pyra
Große Röder
Großschweidnitzer Wasser
Gruna
Grundwasser

H
Hammerbach
Haselbach
Helfenberger Bach
Hoyerswerdaer Schwarzwasser

J
Jahna
Jahnabach
Jauer

K
Kabelske
Käbnitz
Kaitzbach
Kaltenbach
Kemmlitzbach
Keppbach
Ketzerbach
Kirnitzsch
Kleine Bockau
Kleine Luppe
Kleine Pleiße
Kleine Pyra
Kleine Röder, tributary of the Black Elster
Kleine Röder, tributary of the Große Röder
Kleine Spree
Kleine Triebisch
Kleinwaltersdorfer Bach
Klosterwasser
Kotitzer Wasser
Krebsgraben
Krippenbach

L
Lachsbach
Landgraben
Landwasser
Langes Wasser
Lausenbach
Lausur
Legnitzka
Leinegraben
Leubnitzbach
Litte
Löbauer Wasser
Lober
Lockwitzbach
Lossa
Lößnitzbach
Lungwitzbach
Luppe
Lusatian Neisse

M
Maltengraben
Mandau
Müglitz
Mühlgrundbach
Mulde
Münzbach

N
Nahle
Natzschung
Neue Luppe
Northern Rietzschke

O
Oberhermsdorfer Bach
Oelsabach
Orla
Otterbach

P
Parthe
Paußnitz
Pietzschebach
Pleiße
Pließnitz
Pöbelbach
Pöhlbach
Pöhlwasser
Polenz
Pösgraben
Preßnitz
Prießnitz
Pulsnitz

Q
Quänebach

R
Räderschnitza
Raklitza
Red Mulde
Red Pockau
Red Weißeritz
Romereifeldgraben
Rosenbach
Roter Graben
Rotes Wasser
Ruhlander Schwarzwasser

S
Satkula
Schaukelgraben
Schirmbach
Schlettenbach
Schlumper
Schnauder
Schwarzbach, tributary of the Große Mittweida
Schwarzbach, tributary of the Mulde
Schwarzbach, tributary of the Sebnitz
Schwarzbach, tributary of the White Elster
Schwarze Röder
Schwarzer Bach
Schwarzer Graben
Schwarzer Schöps
Schwarzwasser, tributary of the Mulde
Schwarzwasser, tributary of the Preßnitz
Schweinitz
Schwennigke
Sebnitz
Sehma
Seidewitz
Seifenbach
Seltenrein
Spitzkunnersdorfer Bach
Spree
Steindöbra
Striegis
Struga
Svatava
Svitávka
Syrabach

T
Treba
Trebnitz
Treuener Wasser
Trieb
Triebisch

V
Verlorenes Wasser

W
Weinske
Weißer Schöps
Weißeritz
Wesenitz
White Elster
White Mulde
Wiederitz
Wild Weißeritz
Wilisch
Wilzsch
Wisenta
Wittgendorfer Wasser
Würschnitz
Wyhra

Z
Zschampert
Zschonerbach
Zschopau
Zwickauer Mulde
Zwittebach
Zwönitz
Zwota
    

 
Saxony-related lists
Saxony